Arvid Knöppel (7 March 1867 – 7 March 1925) was a Swedish sport shooter who competed at the 1908 Summer Olympics. In 1908 he won the gold medal in the team single-shot running deer event.

References

1867 births
1925 deaths
Swedish male sport shooters
Running target shooters
Olympic shooters of Sweden
Shooters at the 1908 Summer Olympics
Olympic gold medalists for Sweden
Olympic medalists in shooting
Medalists at the 1908 Summer Olympics
Sport shooters from Stockholm
19th-century Swedish people
20th-century Swedish people